Lord Culloden may refer to:

 a peerage title, see Baron Culloden
 a courtesy title, see Xan Windsor, Lord Culloden
 a judicial title, see Duncan Forbes, Lord Culloden